Near Infinite Possibility is the fifth studio album released by American singer-songwriter Sarah Fimm.

Critical reception
Trey Spencer of Sputnikmusic gave the album four and a half stars, writing:

In her review for Chronogram, Sharon Nichols wrote:

Track listing
All tracks written by Sarah Fimm. The album's track listing can be obtained from Allmusic.

References

External links

2011 albums
Sarah Fimm albums